The European Foundation is a leading Eurosceptic think tank based in the United Kingdom, founded in 1992. It is chaired by Bill Cash, a British Conservative MP. The organisation produces the European Journal.

The Great College Street Group was formed in October 1992 in order to oppose the Maastricht Treaty. The Group, consisting of politicians, academics, businessmen, lawyers, and economists, provided comprehensive briefs in the campaign to win the arguments both in Parliament and in the country. The European Foundation was created out of Great College Street by Bill Cash after the Maastricht debates. It exists to conduct a vigorous campaign in the UK to leave the European Union. The Foundation continues to establish links with like-minded organisations across Europe and the world.

It was reported in 1996 that the European Foundation was being funded by Sir James Goldsmith the then leader of the British Referendum Party. Because there was an approaching election at which Conservative and Referendum candidates would be contesting the same seats, Cash was forced to sever the link. The shortfall in funding was plugged by Margaret Thatcher, who later became the European Foundation's Patron, a position she held until her death.

Office Holders
Former Patron: The Rt Hon the Baroness Thatcher LG OM FRS PC
Chairman: Sir Bill Cash MP
European Director: Dr Paola del Bigio
Head of Research and Editor of the European Journal: Margarida Vasconcelos

Former Office Holders
 Iain Duncan Smith

References

External links
 Official web site

Euroscepticism in the United Kingdom
Foreign policy and strategy think tanks based in the United Kingdom
Political and economic research foundations
Political and economic think tanks based in the United Kingdom
Think tanks established in 1992
1992 establishments in the United Kingdom